The Women's Hockey Commissioners Association National Rookie of the Year is awarded yearly to the rookie player in NCAA Division I women's college ice hockey by the Women's Hockey Commissioners Association.

Award winners

Winners by school

References

College sports freshman awards